Alejandro Martínez may refer to:
Alejandro Martínez Hernández (born 1962), Mexican politician
Alejandro Martínez (actor) (born 1966), Colombian actor
Alejandro Martínez (Mexican footballer) (born 1990), Mexican footballer

See also
Alex Martinez (disambiguation)
Alexandro Martínez Camberos (1916-1999), Mexican judge